MRT 3 Sat  is a Macedonian television channel owned and operated by Macedonian Radio Television.

References 

Macedonian Radio Television
Television channels in North Macedonia